Thapa dynasty or Thapa noble family was a Kshatriya political family that handled Nepali administration affairs between 1806 and 1837 A.D. and 1843 to 1845 A.D. as Mukhtiyar (Prime Minister). This was one of the four noble families to be involved in the active politics of the Kingdom of Nepal, along with the Shah dynasty, Basnyat family, and the Pande dynasty before the rise of the Rana dynastyor Kunwar family. At the end of 18th century, Thapas had extreme dominance over Nepalese Darbar politics alternatively contesting for central power against the Pande family. Bir Bhadra Thapa was a Thapa of Chhetri group and leading Bharadar during Unification of Nepal. His grandson Bhimsen Thapa became Mukhtiyar of Nepal and established Thapa dynasty to the dominating position of central court politics of Nepal.

The Thapa family gave rise to the Rana dynasty of Jung Bahadur Kunwar Rana whose father Bal Narsingh Kunwar was the son-in-law of Kaji Nain Singh Thapa. Similarly, this dynasty was connected to the Pande aristocratic family through Nain Singh Thapa who was the son-in-law of once Mulkaji Ranajit Pande

Background 
The Thapa dynasty comes from the family of Kaji Bir Bhadra Thapa, commander of Unification of Nepal. He had three sons: Jeevan Thapa (died at the Battle of Kirtipur), Bangsha Raj Thapa, and Amar Singh Thapa (Sardar). The eldest son of Amar Singh Thapa (Sardar) was Bhimsen Thapa who later became an essential ruler in Nepalese history.

The rise of Thapas (1743–1806)

The family became prominent during the rule of King Prithvi Narayan Shah and were established as a dominant faction during the reign of King Rana Bahadur Shah. After the assassination of King Rana Bahadur Shah, Bhimsen Thapa rose to the event killing all enemies and proving the strength and presence of the Thapa family in the Royal Court of Nepal. He went on to become the second Prime Minister of Nepal and thus founded the Thapa family in the political context of Nepal. Afterwards, the Thapas took the stronghold of the military power with an absolute order, which leads to a rivalry among other nobles.

Thapas on power (1806–1837) 

Tripurasundari was the daughter of Bhimsen's brother, Kazi Nain Singh Thapa. After the chaos that followed King Rana Bahadur's murder, Bhimsen became the Mukhtiyar and his niece Tripurasundari was given the title Lalita Tripurasundari and declared regent and Queen Mother of Nepal. The Thapa family remained in power continuously even after the death of King Girvan Yuddha Bikram Shah and even after the peace deal (Treaty of Sugauli) with the British East India Company done between the then ruling prime minister Bhimsen Thapa representative of Nepal and British. The modernization of the Nepalese Army was done to keep things in control while convincing the suspicious British of no intention to use. Bhimsen increased his family members in court and military and also transferred other aristocratic families away from the capital. Bhimsen instated his youngest brother, General Ranabir Singh Thapa, in the royal palace as chief palace authority. Any meetings between the royal family and commoners or Bhardars were done under his permission and observation.

Thapas remained on political power from the military domination by Bhimsen Thapa. It was no secret that Bhimsen was able to maintain his supremacy due to the large standing army under his and his family's command. Thus, King Rajendra of Nepal feared the Thapa faction as

The downfall of Thapas (1837–1839)

Bhimsen had committed atrocities against the Pande family by being involved in the execution of Nepalese Chief Kazi Damodar Pande. Rana Jang Pande, the youngest son of Damodar Pande, was a supporter of Senior Queen Samrajya Laxmi and had planned for the downfall of the thirty-one year Thapa rule. In the Nepalese court, the rivalry between the two queens rose where the Senior Queen supported the Pandes, while the Junior Queen supported the Thapas. Bhimsen went to his ancestral home in Gorkha for some time making Ranabir Singh Thapa as Acting Mukhtiyar. Rana Jang Pande, the leading member of Pande aristocratic family and his brother, Ranadal Pande, was elevated in the Nepal Darbar.

On 24 July 1837, King Rajendra Bikram Shah's infant son, Devendra Bikram Shah, died. Bhimsen and members of the Thapa faction were blamed and conspired against. On this charge, Bhimsen and whole the Thapa family, the court physicians, Ekdev and Eksurya Upadhyay, and his deputy Bhajuman Baidya, with relatives of the Thapas were incarcerated, proclaimed outcasts, and their properties confiscated.

Fatte Jang Shah, Rangnath Poudel, and the Junior Queen Rajya Laxmi Devi, the anti-Pande faction, obtained from the King the liberation of Bhimsen, Mathabar, and the rest of the party, about eight months after they were incarcerated for the poisoning case. Confiscation of some properties was pardoned. The pro-Thapa soldiers rallied to Bhimsen, Mathabar Singh, and Sherjung Thapa's houses. Mathabar Singh fled to India while pretending to go on a hunting trip; Ranbir Singh gave up all his property and became a sanyasi, titling himself Swami Abhayananda; but Bhimsen Thapa preferred to remain in his old home in Gorkha.

The final chapter of Thapas (1843–1845)

The resurrection of Thapa 

Mathabarsingh Thapa fled to India when Bhimsen Thapa and Thapa courtiers were punished. Sher Jung Thapa and other jailed Thapa members were pardoned on the request of Junior Queen after the death of Senior Queen. Mathabar, the most senior Thapa, was requested to return to Nepal by then ruling Junior Queen Rajya Laxmi after six years of exile. Mathabarsingh Thapa arrived in Kathmandu Valley on 17 April 1843 where he was greeted with state honors. He then re-opened the murder case of his uncle and godfather Bhimsen Thapa, and members of Pande faction and their supporters were executed.

End of Thapas 
The murder of Mathabar Singh on 17 May 1845 by his nephew, Janga Bahadur Kunwar, on the orders of King Rajendra Bikram Shah and his Junior Queen, ended the Thapa family's rule in Nepal giving rise to Agnatic Rana dynasty.

Family palaces 

The family resided at Thapathali Durbar and Bagh Durbar. Bagh Durbar was constructed by Bhimsen Thapa, who moved to reside near the Basantapur Palace. He initially moved from Gorkha district to Thapathali Durbar and eventually to Bagh Durbar.

Bagh Durbar, which literally means The Tiger's Mansion, was built in 1805 A.D. by PM Bhimsen Thapa. It had a spacious Janarala Bagh (General's Garden), a pond and many temples glorifying the Mukhtiyar General. When Thapa rule was revived, PM Mathabarsingh Thapa recaptured the lost palace and resided there for two years.

The National Museum of Nepal at Chhauni was once a residence to Prime Minister Bhimsen Thapa. The building has collection of bronze sculptures, paubha paintings, and weapons including the sword gifted by King of France Napoleon Bonaparte.

Thapa family members

Family Tree of Bir Bhadra Thapa

Family Tree of Kazi  Singh Thapa

Other Thapa nobles

The unrelated family of Amar Singh Thapa was also included in broader Thapa caucus.

Allies and opponents 
List of Allies during Transition Phase (1837–1846)

List of Opponents during Transition Phase (1837–1846)

Works 

Dharahara tower was built by Mukhtiyar Bhimsen Thapa. Dharahara is said to be built for Queen Tripurasundari of Nepal, who was the niece of Bhimsen Thapa.

Gallery

See also 
 Basnyat family
 Rana dynasty
 Rathore dynasty
 Shah dynasty

References

Notes

Sources

External links

 
Kshatriya communities
Nepalese noble families
Nepalese politicians
Chhetri noble families
Dynasties of Nepal
18th-century establishments in Nepal